Liberalism in Serbia is limited to liberal parties with substantial support, mainly proved by having had a representation in parliament. The sign ⇒ denotes another party in that scheme. For inclusion in this scheme it is not necessary so that parties labeled themselves as a liberal party.

Introduction
Liberal parties were active in former Serbia and later in Yugoslavia. After the restoration of democracy liberal factions became active again.

The timeline

From Liberals to Nationalists
 1848: Beginning of differentiating of political currents, liberals noticeable next to the conservatives
 1858: Liberals organized themselves though not yet as political party in the modern sense
 1881: The group established the Society for the promotion of Serbian Literature (Дружина за помагање српске књижевности) NGO
 1883: The organization is formed into a political party: Liberal Party (Либерална странка)
 1904: A left-wing faction seceded as the ⇒ Liberal Democratic Party (Либерално демократска странка) returning to original liberal ideas, the remainder continues as the National Party (Национална странка) straying far away from liberalism
 1905: The ⇒ Liberal Democratic Party reunited the National Party into the People's Party (Народна странка) of the liberal center
 1919: The party merged with the Independent Radical Party and the Serbian Progressive Party (among many others) into the ⇒ Yugoslav Democratic Party

Progressive Party
 1842: The Constitution-defenders (Уставобранитељи) are organized, first forefathers of the progressives
 1868: The Young Conservatives are organized, although not yet as a political party
 1881: The Serbian Progressive Party (Српска напредна странка) is founded with many strong liberal ideas
 1896: The party dissolved
 1906: The party is reestablished, fully reformed
 1914: The conservative faction seceded as the Serbian Conservative Party (Конзервативна странка)
 1919: The party merged with the People's Party and the Independent Radical Party (along with many others) into the ⇒ Yugoslav Democratic Party
 1920: The party is reestablished by the remainder that didn't join into the Democrats
 1925: The party ceased to exist

Radical Party
 1881: People's Radical Party (Народна радикална странка) was founded as a classical radical party.
 1903: Liberal wing secedes from the People's Radical Party and forms the Independent Radical Party (Самостална радикална странка)
 1919: The Independent Radical Party merges with the ⇒ Serbian Progressive Party and the People's Party, along with many other political forces from former Austria-Hungary into the pan-Yugoslav ⇒ State Party of Serbian, Croatian and Slovene Democrats

From Democrats to Liberals
 1919: The Independent Radical Party merges with the Serbian Progressive Party and the People's Party, along with many other political forces from former Austria-Hungary into the pan-Yugoslav State Party of Serbian, Croatian and Slovene Democrats (Државотворна странка демократа Срба, Хрвата и Словенаца / Državnotvorna stranka demokrata Srba, Hrvata i Slovenaca)
 1919: A group of hard-core republicans secedes
 1920: The republican dissidents form the Republican Democratic Party (Републиканска демократска странка / Republikanska demokratska stranka)
 1921: Republican Party is renamed as Yugoslav Republican Party (Југословенска републиканска странка / Jugoslovenska republikanska stranka)
 1921: The party is formally named as the Yugoslav Democratic Party (Југословенска демократска странка / Jugoslovenska demokratska stranka) gaining a statute
 1924: A faction formed the ⇒ Independent Democratic Party (Самостална демократска странка / Samostalna demokratska stranka)
 1929: monarchic dictatorship is established and parties are banned
 1935: preserving structure, the Democrats return into politics with the reintroduction of multi-parliamentarism
 1945: Parties are again banned, JDS goes into pacifist resistance to Communism
 1948: JDS is destroyed by Communists, but "Our Word" (Naša reč) emigrant newspaper is organized maintaining Democrats' ideology
 1963: emigrants reform the party as the Democratic Alternative (Demokratska alternativa) emigrant movement abroad
 1968: student liberal demonstrations in Belgrade, opposition to Communist dictatorship formed => Committee for the Protection of Human Rights (Комитет за заштиту људских права / Komitet za zaštitu ljudskih prava), considered predecessor of the modern Democratic Party
 1982: Democratic Alternative ceases to exist
 1989: Reestablishment of the party declared (Democratic Party (Serbia)
 1990: The party is reorganized as a political party, but just in Serbia
 1990: "Our Word" stops editing
 1991: A nationalist group seceded as the Serbian Liberal Party (Српска либерална странка / Srpska liberalna stranka)
 1992: Conservative wing seceded as the Democratic Party of Serbia (Демократска странка Србије / Demokratska stranka Srbije)
 1996: A faction seceded as the Democratic Center (Демократски центар / Demokratski centar)
 2001: The party changed its ideology to social democracy
 2004: The ⇒ Democratic Centre returned into the Democratic Party
 2005: A faction seceded as the ⇒ Liberal Democratic Party
 2007: ⇒ Civic Alliance of Serbia merged into the Liberal Democratic Party

From Union of Reform Forces of Yugoslavia to Reformist Party
 1989: The pan-Yugoslav Union of Reform Forces of Yugoslavia (Savez reformskih snaga Jugoslavije) is founded
 1991: The party is renamed in Serbia into the Reformist Party (Reformska stranka)
 1992: The party merged with the Republican Club (Republikanski klub) into the Civic Alliance of Serbia (Građanski savez Srbije)

Civic Alliance of Serbia
 1992: The ⇒ Reformist Party merged with the Republican Club (Republikanski klub) to form the Civic Alliance of Serbia (Građanski savez Srbije)
 1996: A left wing faction seceded as the ⇒ Social Democratic Union (Socijaldemokratska unija)
 2007: The party merged into the ⇒ Liberal Democratic Party

Liberal leaders
 Čedomilj Mijatović
 Milan Piroćanac
 Milutin Garašanin
 Stojan Novaković
 Ljubomir Davidović
 Milan Grol
 Zoran Đinđić

See also
 History of Serbia
 Politics of Serbia
 List of political parties in Serbia

 
Serbia
Politics of Serbia